Alfred Jackson (born August 3, 1955), is a former professional American football wide receiver who played 7 seasons in the National Football League for the Atlanta Falcons from 1978 to 1984.

1955 births
Living people
People from Cameron, Texas
American football wide receivers
Texas Longhorns football players
Atlanta Falcons players
People from Caldwell, Texas